The Brandlammhorn (3,108 m) is a mountain of the Bernese Alps, overlooking the Unteraar Glacier and Lake Grimsel in the canton of Bern. It lies on the range east of the Bächlistock, which separates the Bächlital from the Unteraar valley.

References

External links
Brandlammhorn on Hikr

Mountains of the Alps
Alpine three-thousanders
Bernese Alps
Mountains of Switzerland
Mountains of the canton of Bern